Yogyogeshwar Jai Shankar is an Indian Marathi language mythological TV series. It is directed by Chinmay Udgirkar and produced by Sanjay Zankar under the banner of Zankar Films. The show premiered from 30 May 2022 on Colors Marathi by replacing Tuzya Rupacha Chandana. It stars Aarush Bedekar and Sangram Samel in lead roles.

Cast 
 Aarush Bedekar as child Shankar Maharaj
 Sangram Samel as elder Shankar Maharaj
 Uma Pendharkar
 Shrushti Pagare as Pawani
 Sonali Patil
 Pranit Hate

References

External links 
 Yogyogeshwar Jai Shankar at Voot

2022 Indian television series debuts
Colors Marathi original programming
Marathi-language television shows